Andrei Leonidovich Aleksandrov (born 9 February 1968) is a former Russian football player.

Club career
He played in lower leagues of Russian football, including three seasons in the second-tier Russian Football National League.

Playing for Galaks in 1992 in the away game against FC Volochanin Vyshny Volochyok (1–1) he saved the first three penalty kicks, and when the referee appointed the fourth one he took off his pants and turned to him, for which he was shown a red card.

References

External links

1968 births
Russian footballers
Living people
Association football goalkeepers
FC Zenit Saint Petersburg players
FC Dynamo Saint Petersburg players
FC Znamya Truda Orekhovo-Zuyevo players